The BFW M.35, sometimes known as the Messerschmitt M 35, was a German sports plane of the early 1930s. It was the last of a line designed by Willy Messerschmitt.

Development
During the period of 1927-33, Messerschmitt designed a series of six sport planes, the single-seat M.17 and M.19, and the two-seat M.23, M.27 M.31, and finally the M.35. With the exception of the M.23, none sold in large numbers. They were all single-engine low-wing cantilever monoplanes with open cockpits and fixed undercarriage. The M.35 kept the extended fuselage of the M.27 and combined it with an undercarriage of single leg, spatted form.

Two different engines were used. The M35a had a 112 kW (150 hp), seven-cylinder radial Siemens Sh 14a, and the M.35b a 100 kW (135 hp) four-cylinder inline inverted air-cooled Argus As 8b. The former was the shorter and faster of the two. The aircraft first flew in 1933.

Operational history
The aircraft was first shown to the public and potential buyers at the 1934 Aerosalon in Geneva. In that year, Rudolf Hess won the Zugspitz trophy in a M.35. In 1934-1935, Wilhelm Stör won the German Aerobatic Championship in a M.35b, and in 1935 the women's prize was taken by Vera von Bissing in a similar machine. Stör can be seen flying an M.35 in daring acrobatic maneuvers during the 1935 German film Wunder des Fliegens (Miracle of Flight).

Despite these successes and strong performances at other venues in the late 1930s, only 15 M.35s were built, 13 registered in Germany, one in Spain and reputedly one in Romania. Though the M.35a was faster, the M.35b was commoner; only two M.35as are definitely identified.

Operators

Spanish Republican Air Force

Specifications (M.35a)

See also

References

Citations

Cited sources

1930s German sport aircraft
M 35
Aerobatic aircraft
Low-wing aircraft
Single-engined tractor aircraft
Aircraft first flown in 1933